Clyde Maughan is an electrical engineer at Maughan Engineering Consultants in Schenectady, New York. He was named a Fellow of the Institute of Electrical and Electronics Engineers (IEEE) in 2016 for his contributions to large generator insulation systems and generator failure mechanisms.

References 

Fellow Members of the IEEE
Living people
Year of birth missing (living people)
American electrical engineers